Eupithecia horismoides is a moth in the family Geometridae. It is found in the regions of Araucania (Cautin Province)  and Los Lagos (the provinces of Osorno, Llanquihue, and Chiloe) in Chile. The habitat consists of the Northern Valdivian Forest and Valdivian Forest Biotic provinces.

The length of the forewings is about 14–16 mm for males and 14.5-16.5 mm for females. The forewings are brown, with irregular ochraceous brown cross lines. The hindwings are greyer than the forewings. Adults have been recorded on wing in October and from December to March.

Etymology
The specific name is derived from the generic name Horisme, with the Greek suffix -oides (meaning resembling or having the form of) and refers to the superficial resemblance to a Horisme species.

References

Moths described in 1987
horismoides
Moths of South America
Endemic fauna of Chile